Jake Hunter Johnson is a Republican member of the North Carolina House of Representatives who has represented the 113th district (including all of Polk and Transylvania counties as well as part of Henderson county) since 2019. He was appointed to fill the unexpired term of Cody Henson in August 2019 and was re-elected to the seat in 2020. A real estate agent from Saluda, North Carolina, he previously served on the Polk County board of commissioners from 2016 to 2019.

Electoral history

Committee assignments

2021-2022 session
Appropriations (Vice Chair)
Appropriations - Information Technology (Chair)
Commerce (Vice Chair)
Homeland Security, Military, and Veterans Affairs
Regulatory Reform
UNC BOG Nominations

References

External links
Campaign Website

Living people
University of North Carolina at Charlotte alumni
People from Saluda, North Carolina
Year of birth missing (living people)
Republican Party members of the North Carolina House of Representatives
21st-century American politicians